Wedding Night in Paradise is a 1950 West German musical comedy film directed by Géza von Bolváry and starring Johannes Heesters, Claude Farell, and Gretl Schörg. It was shot at the Wiesbaden Studios and on location in Venice. The film's sets were designed by the art director Paul Markwitz and Fritz Maurischat. It is an operetta film, based on the 1942 stage work of the same title.

Cast

References

Bibliography

External links 
 

1950 films
1950 musical comedy films
German musical comedy films
West German films
1950s German-language films
Films directed by Géza von Bolváry
Films based on operettas
Operetta films
Films set in Venice
German black-and-white films
1950s German films